Nepflights is an online API based domestic flight booking platform for Nepal, established in 2014. Nepflights is the only website in Nepal that provides domestic flights booking within the country. The company made strategic growth through new channels and by connecting with more airlines and markets in Nepal. It will launch an app for mobile devices. The company has been recognized as one of Nepal's best flight booking platform  with five airlines, Buddha Air, Saurya Airlines, Simrik Airlines, Tara Air, Yeti Airlines, four payment partners, eSewa, Ipay, PayPal, NIBL, and flying to 25 destinations.

References

External links
 
 esewa website

2014 establishments in Nepal
Nepalese travel websites